Phaeosphaeria is a genus of fungi in the family Phaeosphaeriaceae. It has about 95 species. The genus was circumscribed by Japanese mycologist Ichiro Miyake in 1909, with Phaeosphaeria oryzae assigned as the type species.

Species
Phaeosphaeria acaciae 
Phaeosphaeria acori 
Phaeosphaeria aeluropodis 
Phaeosphaeria agminalis 
Phaeosphaeria ampeli 
Phaeosphaeria anchiala 
Phaeosphaeria annulata 
Phaeosphaeria arenaria 
Phaeosphaeria associata 
Phaeosphaeria bambusae 
Phaeosphaeria barriae 
Phaeosphaeria berlesei 
Phaeosphaeria borealis 
Phaeosphaeria breonadiae 
Phaeosphaeria brizae 
Phaeosphaeria calamicola 
Phaeosphaeria calderi 
Phaeosphaeria canadensis 
Phaeosphaeria capensis 
Phaeosphaeria caricicola 
Phaeosphaeria caricinella 
Phaeosphaeria caricis 
Phaeosphaeria caricis-firmae 
Phaeosphaeria caricis-vesicariae 
Phaeosphaeria cassiicola 
Phaeosphaeria cattanei 
Phaeosphaeria celata 
Phaeosphaeria chiangraina 
Phaeosphaeria chinensis 
Phaeosphaeria cinnae 
Phaeosphaeria consobrina 
Phaeosphaeria cookei 
Phaeosphaeria corallorhizae 
Phaeosphaeria crenata 
Phaeosphaeria culmorum 
Phaeosphaeria cycadis 
Phaeosphaeria cyperina 
Phaeosphaeria dennisiana 
Phaeosphaeria dryadis 
Phaeosphaeria elaeagni 
Phaeosphaeria elymi 
Phaeosphaeria emilii 
Phaeosphaeria epicalamia 
Phaeosphaeria equiseti 
Phaeosphaeria erikssonii 
Phaeosphaeria eriobotryae 
Phaeosphaeria eupatoriicola 
Phaeosphaeria eustoma 
Phaeosphaeria exarata 
Phaeosphaeria fautreyi 
Phaeosphaeria fetanensis 
Phaeosphaeria firmicola 
Phaeosphaeria franklinensis 
Phaeosphaeria fuckelii 
Phaeosphaeria fuckelioides 
Phaeosphaeria fusispora 
Phaeosphaeria gessneri 
Phaeosphaeria gigaspora 
Phaeosphaeria glebosoverrucosa 
Phaeosphaeria glyceriae-plicatae 
Phaeosphaeria graminis 
Phaeosphaeria guttulata 
Phaeosphaeria halima 
Phaeosphaeria heptamera 
Phaeosphaeria herpotrichoides 
Phaeosphaeria hesperia 
Phaeosphaeria hiemalis 
Phaeosphaeria hierochloes 
Phaeosphaeria humerata 
Phaeosphaeria huronensis 
Phaeosphaeria inclusa 
Phaeosphaeria infuscans 
Phaeosphaeria insignis 
Phaeosphaeria japonica 
Phaeosphaeria juncicola 
Phaeosphaeria juncina 
Phaeosphaeria juncinella 
Phaeosphaeria juncophila 
Phaeosphaeria kukutae 
Phaeosphaeria kunzeana 
Phaeosphaeria larseniana 
Phaeosphaeria laxitunicata 
Phaeosphaeria licatensis 
Phaeosphaeria lindii 
Phaeosphaeria livistonae 
Phaeosphaeria lucilla 
Phaeosphaeria luctuosa 
Phaeosphaeria lunariae 
Phaeosphaeria lunata 
Phaeosphaeria lutea 
Phaeosphaeria lycopodiicola 
Phaeosphaeria lycopodina 
Phaeosphaeria macrosporidium 
Phaeosphaeria marciensis 
Phaeosphaeria maritima 
Phaeosphaeria marram 
Phaeosphaeria maydis 
Phaeosphaeria michiganensis 
Phaeosphaeria microscopica 
Phaeosphaeria minima 
Phaeosphaeria minuscula 
Phaeosphaeria moravica 
Phaeosphaeria mounceae 
Phaeosphaeria nanosalicium 
Phaeosphaeria nardi 
Phaeosphaeria neomaritima 
Phaeosphaeria nigrans 
Phaeosphaeria nodorum 
Phaeosphaeria nodulispora 
Phaeosphaeria norfolcia 
Phaeosphaeria occidentalis 
Phaeosphaeria occulta 
Phaeosphaeria olivacea 
Phaeosphaeria oryzae 
Phaeosphaeria ovei 
Phaeosphaeria palmarum 
Phaeosphaeria panici 
Phaeosphaeria papayae 
Phaeosphaeria papua-alpina 
Phaeosphaeria papyricola 
Phaeosphaeria parvograminis 
Phaeosphaeria parvula 
Phaeosphaeria penniseti 
Phaeosphaeria petkovicensis 
Phaeosphaeria phoenicicola 
Phaeosphaeria phragmitis 
Phaeosphaeria physalidis 
Phaeosphaeria pleurospora 
Phaeosphaeria poagena 
Phaeosphaeria podocarpi 
Phaeosphaeria pomona 
Phaeosphaeria pontiformis 
Phaeosphaeria pulchra 
Phaeosphaeria punctillum 
Phaeosphaeria recessa 
Phaeosphaeria robusta 
Phaeosphaeria roemeriani 
Phaeosphaeria rousseliana 
Phaeosphaeria rubescens 
Phaeosphaeria salebricola 
Phaeosphaeria saxonica 
Phaeosphaeria scirpicola 
Phaeosphaeria scotophila 
Phaeosphaeria sequana 
Phaeosphaeria silenes-acaulis 
Phaeosphaeria sinensis 
Phaeosphaeria sorghi-arundinacei 
Phaeosphaeria sowerbyi 
Phaeosphaeria sparsa 
Phaeosphaeria spartinae 
Phaeosphaeria spartinicola 
Phaeosphaeria sporoboli 
Phaeosphaeria stellariae 
Phaeosphaeria stipae 
Phaeosphaeria subalpina 
Phaeosphaeria sylvatica 
Phaeosphaeria tenuispora 
Phaeosphaeria thomasiana 
Phaeosphaeria thorae 
Phaeosphaeria thysanolaenicola 
Phaeosphaeria tini 
Phaeosphaeria tofieldiae 
Phaeosphaeria tricincta 
Phaeosphaeria triglochinicola 
Phaeosphaeria variiseptata 
Phaeosphaeria vilasensis 
Phaeosphaeria viridella 
Phaeosphaeria volkartiana 
Phaeosphaeria weberi

References

Phaeosphaeriaceae
Dothideomycetes genera
Taxa described in 1909